This is a list of festivals in the province of Manitoba, Canada. This list includes festivals of diverse types, such as regional festivals, commerce festivals, fairs, food festivals, arts festivals, religious festivals, folk festivals, and recurring festivals on holidays. The province hosts several large festivals each year including Winnipeg Folk Festival, Winnipeg Jazz Festival, and Winnipeg Fringe Theatre Festival.

Arts festivals

Art festivals 

 Manitoba Fibre Festival
 Nuit Blanche Winnipeg
 Wall-to-Wall Mural & Culture Festival
 Winnipeg Design Festival

Comedy festivals 
Winnipeg Comedy Festival
Winnipeg Improv Festival

Film festivals 

 African Movie Festival in Manitoba
 Architecture+Design Film Festival
 Canadian International Comedy Film Festival
 Cinémental
 FascinAsian Film Festival
 Freeze Frame International Film Festival
 L'Alliance Française French Film Festival
 Gimme Some Truth Documentary Festival
 Reel Pride
 Winnipeg Aboriginal Film Festival
 Winnipeg Fringe Theatre Festival
 Winnipeg International Jewish Film Festival
 Winnipeg Reel to Reel Film Festival
 WNDX Festival of Moving Image

Literary festivals 

 Manitoba Book Awards
 Winnipeg International Storytelling Festival
 Winnipeg International Writers Festival

Music festivals
Dauphin’s Countryfest (in Dauphin)
Manitoba Electronic Music Exhibition
Soca Reggae Festival
Winnipeg Folk Festival
Winnipeg International Jazz Festival
Winnipeg New Music Festival
Bankside Music Festival

Theatre and stage festivals 
FemFest
Manitoba Drama Youth Festival
Royal MTC Master Playwright Festival (2001-2021)
Winnipeg Improv Festival
Winnipeg Fringe Theatre Festival

Other festivals
CURRENT Winnipeg
Harvest Moon Festival (in Clearwater) — celebrates harvest season
Manitoba Liquor & Lotteries ManyFest — street festival
Manitoba's Return to Rodeo Festival (in Morris) — rodeo festival
Morden Corn & Apple Festival (in Morden) — street festival
Science Rendezvous Winnipeg
Winnipeg International Children's Festival (KidsFest)
Northern Manitoba Trappers' Festival

Cultural festivals
Ai-Kon — Anime convention
Canada's National Ukrainian Festival — Ukrainian culture
Festival du Voyageur — Franco-Manitoban heritage
Folklorama — various cultures
Le Rendezvous — French and Métis culture
Manito Ahbee Festival — Indigenous culture
Mardi Gras
Cultural film festivals:

 Cinémental — French
 FascinAsian Film Festival — Asian
 L'Alliance Française French Film Festival — French
 Winnipeg Aboriginal Film Festival — Indigenous
 Winnipeg International Jewish Film Festival — Jewish

LGBTQ+ festivals
Pride Winnipeg
Reel Pride

References

 
Manitoba-related lists
Manitoba
Manitoba
Culture of Manitoba